Aquatic macroinvertebrates are insects in their nymph and larval stages, snails, worms, crayfish, and clams that spend at least part of their lives in water. They play a large role in freshwater ecosystems by recycling nutrients as well as providing food to higher trophic levels. 

They are visible to the naked eye, do not possess a vertebral column, and spend at least a portion of their lives in water. These invertebrates are ubiquitous to freshwater ecosystems around the world and are present in both lotic and lentic ecosystems, often living among the rocks and sediment. Aquatic macroinvertebrates include insects, bivalves, gastropods, annelids, and crustaceans. Aquatic insect orders include Trichoptera, Ephemeroptera, Odonata, Megaloptera, Plecoptera, Diptera, and Coleoptera.

Life histories 
Aquatic macroinvertebrates are oviparous, however their life history strategies vary. Their reproductive strategies fall along a continuum between semelparous and iteroparous, and involve differences in egg number, egg size, and brood care. Once they hatch, the majority of aquatic macroinvertebrates undergo three main life stages: nymph, pupa, and adult. Some taxa, like dragonflies, spend their adult stage outside the water. Other taxa, like water beetles, are aquatic for their entire lives. The evolution of different life history strategies of aquatic macroinvertebrates has allowed species to take advantage of differences in food supply and allow some to better tolerate extreme environmental conditions.

Feeding 
Macroinvertebrates play an important role in aquatic food webs as they are major food sources for higher trophic levels. Macroinvertebrates are also crucial in aquatic nutrient cycling. They are often food generalists and have therefore been classified into five main groups called functional feeding groups. This facilitates the incorporation of their ecological roles into research studies. Their classification into these five groups is based on a combination of their morphological characteristics and behavioral mechanisms of feeding. These groups include shredders, grazers, gatherers, filterers, and predators.

The River Continuum Concept proposed by Vannote, predicts the functional distribution of aquatic macroinvertebrates in a stream based on food resources. This concept highlights the importance of freshwater ecosystem inputs to food resources and how this influences aquatic macroinvertebrate communities

Shredders 
Shredders feed on coarse particulate organic matter (CPOM) from terrestrial leaf litter inputs. Using their mouthparts, they shred organic matter to feed and in doing so, suspend smaller particles into the water column. Examples include Diptera (e.g. Tipulidae) and Plecoptera (e.g. Tallaperla).

Grazers 
Grazers use rasping mouthparts to scrape biofilm and algae off rocks and submerged aquatic vegetation and include Ephemeroptera (e.g. Baetidae). Their grazing affects algal biomass in aquatic ecosystems and therefore primary production in aquatic ecosystems.

Collectors/Gatherers 

Collectors/gatherers primarily scavenge stream or lakebed substrates for deposited fine particulate organic matter (FPOM) and dead organisms. They play a role in bioturbation and resuspension of organic matter and include Diptera (e.g. Chironomidae).

Filterers 
Filterers remove suspended FPOM from the water column using a variety of filtering mechanisms. They expend less energy searching for food, rather relying on sufficient current velocity and upstream food supply. Examples include Diptera (e.g. Simuliidae) and Coleoptera (e.g. Elmidae).

Predators 
Predators consume animal tissue and therefore have direct top-down effects on the food web. Some predator species include Odonata and Plecoptera larvae which utilize grasping mouthparts to ambush their prey.

Bioindicators 
Aquatic macroinvertebrate communities are strongly influenced by their environment, and act as bioindicators for the overall condition of freshwater ecosystems. Species have been classified based on their tolerance to environmental changes, and their assemblages can therefore indicate if an ecosystem is healthy. The orders Ephemeroptera, Plecoptera, and Trichoptera are sensitive to pollutants so they are used to calculate an EPT index to indicate water quality.

References

Aquatic organisms